General Fowler may refer to:

Charles Astley Fowler (1865–1940), British Indian Army major general
Francis John Fowler (1864–1939), British Indian Army major general
John Fowler (British Army officer) (1864–1939), British Army lieutenant general
John Gordon Fowler (1905–1971), U.S. Air Force brigadier general